Leslie Best (20 November 1893 – 27 August 1925) was an Australian cricketer. He played one first-class match for New South Wales in 1914/15.

See also
 List of New South Wales representative cricketers

References

External links
 

1893 births
1925 deaths
Australian cricketers
New South Wales cricketers
Cricketers from Sydney